Jursitzky (or Jurczycki) is the name of an ancient Polish noble family. In 1404, Watzlaw Jursitzky was registered in the Cracow coat of arms as a member of the Topór clan.

Coat of arms  
The Topór coat of arms was used by the Jursitzky family. Some family members used the  Nowina, Strzemię,  and the Radwan coat of arms.

Name 
The ancient name "Jurczycki z Jurczyc" derives from the first name Georg (Slavic: "Juri"); it means sons of Georg (The "ki" at the end of the name means "son of"). Over time, due to political changes and migration in Silesia, the Germanised versions of Jurczycki and Jursitzky came into use.

History 
The family's first ancestral seat was in Jurczyce, Lesser Poland Voivodeship, part of the village of Skawina in Poland, near Cracow. Like many other Polish noble families, the Jursitzkys were impoverished in the 17th century. The house in Jurczyce was sold in 1795 to the Haller family. The Polish general Józef Haller was born in Jurczyce Manor.

Notable members 
Moritz Jursitzky  (1861–1936), Austrian writer
Wilhelm Jursitzky (1896–1944) (executed), Austrian resistance fighter
Bruno Jursitzky   (1898–1944) (executed), Austrian resistance fighter

External links 
familyhistory

German noble families
Polish nobility
Silesian nobility
Slavic-language surnames
Surnames of Silesian origin